FC Fakel Varva is an amateur Ukrainian football team based in Varva, Chernihiv Oblast. The club competes in the Chernihiv oblast competition as Druzhba-Nova Varva. The club was sponsored by the Hnidytsi Gas Refining Factory located in a village of Hnidytsi, Pryluky Raion. The factory is part of the Ukrnafta state corporation.

History

The club was formed in 1963 as Fakel Varva.

The team spent a short stint in the Ukrainian Second Division. After several successful seasons, the team's administration decided to withdraw from the professional league and return to the Chernihiv oblast competitions.

The club is also well known as a competitive amateur club. The club has won the Amateur Cup and the Championship the next season.

The club plays its home games in the Yunist Stadium in Varva.

Name

1963–1969 – Fakel Varva
1970–1993 – Naftovyk Varva
1994–1996 – Fakel Varva
1997–2000 – Fakel-NFZ Varva
2001–2004 – Fakel Varva
2005 onwards – Druzhba-Nova Varva

Honours
Ukrainian Amateur Football Championship
 Winners (2): 1995–96, 2000

Ukrainian Amateur Cup
 Winners (1): 1998–99

Chernihiv Oblast Football Championship
 Winners (5): 1994, 1995, 1999, 2001, 2002Chernihiv Oblast Football Cup Winners (1): 1995'''

League and cup history

Notable players
 Oleh Volotyok
 Yuriy Hetman

See also
 FC Naftovyk-Ukrnafta Okhtyrka

References

 
Football clubs in Chernihiv Oblast
Amateur football clubs in Ukraine
Association football clubs established in 1963
1963 establishments in Ukraine